The 6th All-Africa Games were played from 13 to 23 September 1995 in Harare, Zimbabwe. 46 countries participated in eighteen sports.

South Africa, having previously been banned from competition by the other African nations, was invited to the games for the first time after the fall of Apartheid.

With a record 6000 athletes participating in the games, the games were in danger of growing unmanageable. Juan Antonio Samaranch, asked the organizers not to try to copy the Olympic Games, because of the financial and organizational costs.

Petty controversy again entered the games. An Egyptian woman handball player was accused of being a man and the Egyptian team protested that the lace sleeves worn by the South African gymnasts were too "sexy".

Mozambiques World Champion 800 meter runner Maria de Lurdes Mutola won her speciality in Harare.

Of the 17 sports on the program 8 were open to participation by women: athletics, basketball, gymnastics, handball, swimming, table tennis, tennis and volleyball. Women's diving and netball were to be included but were reduced to demonstration sports due to a lack of entries.

At the closing ceremonies the torch was passed to Johannesburg, South Africa to begin preparations for the VIIth All-Africa Games in 1999.

Medal table

Athletics 

Discus thrower Adewale Olukoju and sprinter Mary Onyali became the first athletes to win four All-Africa gold medals. Onyali won the 100 and 200 metres races, and together with Josphat Machuka, Kenya (5,000 metres and 10,000 metres) they became the only athletes to win more than one event.

In addition, Nigeria won three of the four relay races; 4x400 metres for men and women as well as men's 4x100 metres.

Some new women's events were added: 5000 metres, marathon and triple jump.

Field hockey 

Men: 1. South Africa, 2. Egypt, 3. Kenya, 4. Zimbabwe, 5. Nigeria, 6. Namibia
Women. 1. South Africa, 2. Zimbabwe, 3. Kenya, 4. Namibia, 5. Nigeria, 6. Ghana

Soccer 

The soccer tournament was won by Egypt, who became the first team to win this tournament twice.

References

External links
Athletics results – gbrathletics.com

 
A
African Games
All-Africa Games, 1995
All-Africa Games, 1995
Sport in Harare
All-Africa Games, 1995
Multi-sport events in Zimbabwe
All-Africa Games, 1995
All-Africa Games